The Medal of the Royal Numismatic Society was first awarded in 1883. It is awarded by the Royal Numismatic Society and is one of the highest markers of recognition given to numismatists. The president and Council award the medal annually to an "individual highly distinguished for services to Numismatic Science".

In recent years the medallist has been invited to receive the medal in person and to give a lecture, usually at the society's December Meeting.

Sir John Evans gave the dies for the original silver medal to the society in 1883. The current medal was commissioned from Ian Rank-Broadley in 1993 and is a cast silver medal with the classical theme of Heracles and the Nemean lion. The society commissioned Robert Elderton to create a new medal in 2020–21

List of medallists
Recipients of the Medal of the Royal Numismatic Society and their lecture titles (where available) are given below.Further details about the individual medallists and their contributions to the field of numismatics can be found in the Numismatic Chronicle.

1883 Charles Roach Smith (1807–1890)
1884 Aquilla Smith (1806–1890)
1885 Edward Thomas (1813–1886)
1886 Alexander Cunningham (1814–1893)
1887 John Evans (1823–1908)
1888 Friedrich Imhoof-Blumer (1838–1920)
1889 Percy Gardner (1846–1937)
1890 Jan Pieter Six (1824–1899)
1891 C. Ludwig Müller (1809–1891)
1892 R. Stuart Poole (1832–1895)
1893 W.H. Waddington (1826–1894)
1894 Charles Francis Keary (1848–1917)
1895 Theodor Mommsen (1817–1903)
1896 Frederic W. Madden (1839–1904)
1897 Alfred von Sallet (1842–1897)
1898 William Greenwell (1820–1918)
1899 Ernest Babelon (1854–1924)
1900 Stanley Lane-Poole (1854–1931)
1901 S.E. Baron Wladimir von Tiesenhausen (1825–1902)
1902 Arthur J. Evans (1851–1941)
1903 Gustave Schlumberger (1844–1929)
1904 His Majesty Victor Emmanuel III, King of Italy (1869–1947)
1905 Sir Hermann Weber (1823–1918)
1906 Francesco Gnecchi (1847–1919)
1907 Barclay V. Head (1844–1914)
1908 Heinrich Dressel (1845–1920)
1909 Herbert A. Grueber (1846–1927)
1910 Friedrich Edler von Kenner (1834–1922)
1911 Oliver Codrington (1837–1921)
1912 Max von Bahrfeldt (1856–1936)
1913 George Macdonald (1862–1940)
1914 Jean N. Svoronos (1863–1922)
1915 George Francis Hill (1867–1948)
1916 Théodore Reinach (1860–1928)
1917 L.A. Lawrence (1857–1949)
1918 Not awarded
1919 Adrien Blanchet (1866–1957)
1920 H.B. Earle-Fox and J.S. Shirley-Fox
1921 Percy H. Webb
1922 Frederick A. Walters
1923 J.W. Kubitschek (1858–1936)
1924 Henry Symonds
1925 Edward T. Newell (1886–1941)
1926 R.W. Maclachlan
1927 Adolphe Dieudonné
1928 Sir Charles Oman (1860–1946)
1929 Jules Maurice
1930 Edward A. Sydenham
1931 Helen Farquhar (1859–1953)
1932 H. Nelson Wright (1870–1941)
1933 Kurt Regling
1934 George C. Brooke (posthumously)
1935 Behrendt Pick (1861–1940)
1936 John Allan (1884–1955)
1937 Victor Tourneur
1938 J. Grafton Milne
1939 J.W.E. Pearce
1940 R. B. Whitehead (1879–1967)
1941 Harold Mattingly (1884–1964)
1942 E.S.G. Robinson (1887–1976)
1943 Agnes Baldwin Brett (1876–1955)
1944 Leonard Forrer (1869–1953)
1945 Charles Seltman (1886–1957)
1946 Georg Galster
1947 Eduard von Zambaur
1948 Jocelyn M.C. Toynbee (1897–1985)
1949 Sydney P. Noe (1885–1969)
1950 Karl Pink
1951 H.L. Rabino (posthumously)
1952 Lodovico Laffranchi
1953 Andreas Alföldi (1895–1981)
1954 C. Humphrey V. Sutherland (1908–1986)
1955 A.R. Bellinger
1956 John Walker (1900–1964)
1957 George C. Miles
1958 Philip Grierson (1910–2006)
1959 Oscar Ulrich-Bansa (1895–1973)
1960 C. Wilson Peck (1914–2004)
1961 Henri Seyrig (1895–1973)
1962 Michael Grant (1914–2004)
1963 Willy Schwabacher
1964 Anne S. Robertson (1910–1997)
1965 Jean Lafaurie
1966 Derek F. Allen (1910–1975)
1967 Margaret Thompson (1911–1992)
1968 Paul Balog 1900–1982)
1969 Christopher Evelyn Blunt (1904–1987)
1970 Pierre Bastien
1971 Herbert A. Cahn (1915–2002)
1972 Robert A.G. Carson (1918–2006)
1973 H. Enno van Gelder
1974 George Le Rider
1975 G. Kenneth Jenkins (1918–2005)
1976 J.-B. Colbert de Beaulieu
1977 P. Lal Gupta (1914–2001)
1978 Colin M. Kraay (1918–1982)
1979 Peter Berghaus
1980 Patrick Bruun
1981 Michael Dolley
1982 Otto Mørkholm
1983 Theodore V. Buttrey (1929–2018)
1984 Michael H. Crawford
1985 Paul Naster
1986 Brita Malmer (1925–2013)
1987 D. Michael Metcalf (1933–2018)
1988 Peter R. Franke
1989 Leandre Villaronga
1990 John P.C. Kent (1928–2000)
1991 Eric P. Newman (1911–2017)
1992 Martin J. Price (1939–1995)
1993 Andrew Burnett
1994 Cécile Morrisson
1995 Maria Alföldi
1996 Lord Stewartby (1935–2018)
1997 Jørgen Steen Jensen
1998 Jean-Baptiste Giard (1932–2018)
1999 Joseph E. Cribb
2000 Richard Doty (1942–2013)
2001 Ulla Westermark (1927–2020)
2002 Nicholas Mayhew
2003 Gert Hatz and Vera Hatz
2004 Michel Amandry
2005 Peter Spufford – The Mints of Medieval Europe
2006 François Thierry – The Identification of the Nguyen Thong coins in the monetary law of the sixth year of Canh Hung (Vietnam 1745)
2007 Wolfgang Hahn – Christian symbolism on Aksumite coins – the typological concept and composition
2008 Mark Blackburn (1953–2011) – Interpreting single-finds in a bullion economy: the case of dirhams in Viking-Age Scandinavia
2009 Richard Reece – What are Coin Finds?
2010 Alan Stahl – Learning from the Zecca: the Medieval Mint of Venice as a Model for Pre-modern Minting
2011 Marion Archibald (1935–2016) – Leaden Pennies
2012 Lucia Travaini – Coins as Bread. Bread as Coins
2013 Michael Alram – From Bactria to Gandhara: Coins and Peoples across the Hindu Kush
2014 Roger Bland – What Happened to Gold Coinage in the 3rd Century AD?
2015 Bernd Kluge – Pound Sterling, English Coins and English Numismatics from a Continental Perspective
2016 Pere Pau Ripollès Alegre – The Iberian Coinages, 6th- 1st century BC
2017 Lutz Ilisch – European silver exports to Syria and a Crusader-Ayyubid condominial mint
2018 Johan van Heesch – A new representation of the Antwerp mint (AD 1625)
2019 Sam Moorhead
2020 Keith Rutter
2021 François de Callataÿ

References

Lists of award winners
Medals
Numismatics
Numismatic associations
Awards established in 1883
Awards for numismatics
Royal Numismatic Society